An art centre or arts center is distinct from an art gallery or art museum. An arts centre is a functional community centre with a specific remit to encourage arts practice and to provide facilities such as theatre space, gallery space, venues for musical performance, workshop areas, educational facilities, technical equipment, etc.

In the United States, "art centers" are generally either establishments geared toward exposing, generating, and making accessible art making to arts-interested individuals, or buildings that rent primarily to artists, galleries, or companies involved in art making.

In Britain, the Bluecoat Society of Arts was founded in Liverpool in 1927 following the efforts of a group of artists and art lovers who had occupied Bluecoat Chambers since 1907. Most British art centres began after World War II and gradually changed from mainly middle-class places to 1960s and 1970s trendy, alternative centres and eventually in the 1980s to serving the whole community with a programme of enabling access to wheelchair users and disabled individuals and groups.

In the rest of Europe it is common among most art centres that they are partly government funded, since they are considered to have a positive influence on society and economics according to the Rhineland model philosophy. Many of those organisations started in the 1970s, 1980s and 1990s as squatted spaces and were later legalized.

List of arts centres

Americas

Canada
 Calgary, Alberta: Arts Commons
 Charlottetown, Prince Edward Island: Confederation Centre of the Arts
 Ottawa, Ontario: National Arts Centre
 Toronto, Ontario: Toronto Centre for the Arts
 Vancouver, British Columbia: Firehall Arts Centre
Winnipeg, Manitoba: Manitoba Centennial Centre

United States
 Alexandria, Virginia Torpedo Factory Art Center
 Arlington, Virginia: Artisphere
 Atlanta, Georgia: Eyedrum
 Chicago, Illinois: Hairpin Arts Center, Hyde Park Art Center, Lillstreet Art Center, South Side Community Art Center
 Dallas, Texas: The Dallas Contemporary
 Indianapolis, Indiana: Indianapolis Art Center
 Milford, Pennsylvania: Pike County Arts and Crafts
 Minneapolis, Minnesota: Walker Art Center
 New York City, New York: Apexart, Exit Art, International Studio & Curatorial Program
 Philadelphia, Pennsylvania: Painted Bride Art Center
 Pittsburgh, Pennsylvania: Pittsburgh Center for the Arts, Pittsburgh Glass Center
 Raleigh, North Carolina: Pullen Park

Europe

Belgium
 Ghent: Vooruit

Italy

France
 Nantes: Le Lieu unique

The Netherlands
 Amsterdam: OT301
 Nijmegen: Extrapool
 Rotterdam: WORM

Spain
 Matadero Madrid
Gijón: LABoral Centro de Arte y Creación Industrial

United Kingdom
Aberystwyth: Aberystwyth Arts Centre (1970–present)
Belfast Metropolitan Arts Centre (2012–present)
Birmingham: mac (1962–present)
Bristol: 
Cube Microplex formally Bristol Arts Centre (1964–present)
Arnolfini (1961–present)
Cambridgeshire: Wysing Arts Centre (1989–present)
Cardiff: Chapter Arts Centre (1971–present)
Colchester: Colchester Arts Centre (1980-present)
Coventry: Warwick Arts Centre (?–present)
Derby: Quad (2008–present)
Dundee: Dundee Contemporary Arts (1999–present)
Edinburgh: Summerhall (as arts centre, 2011–present)
Fareham: Ashcroft Arts Centre (1989–present)
Glasgow:
Third Eye Centre (1975–1991)
Centre for Contemporary Arts (1992–present)
Havant: The Spring Arts & Heritage Centre (?–present)
Leicester: Attenborough Arts Centre (?–present)
Liverpool: the Bluecoat (1927–present)
London:
Barbican Centre (1982–present)
Camden Arts Centre (1965 (as Hampstead Arts Centre)–present)
Southbank Centre (1951–present)
Battersea Arts Centre (1980–present)
Manchester:
Cornerhouse (1985–2015)
HOME (2015–present)
Newcastle: Newcastle Arts Centre (founded 1980, opened 1988–present)
Nottingham: Nottingham Contemporary (2009–present)
Norwich: Norwich Arts Centre (1977–present)
Omagh: Strule Arts Centre (?–present)
Poole: Lighthouse (Poole) (1978-present; formerly Poole Arts Centre)
Plymouth: Plymouth Arts Centre (1947–present)

Middle East
Palestine 
 Gerard Behar Center, Jerusalem

Asia

China
 Huaxia Art Centre, Shenzhen

Indonesia
 Ciputra Artpreneur, Jakarta

Philippines
National Arts Center, Los Baños, Laguna
Cultural Center of the Philippines Complex, City of Manila

Taiwan
 Changhua: Lukang Artist Village, National Changhua Living Art Center
 Chiayi City: Art Site of Chiayi Railway Warehouse, Chiayi Cultural and Creative Industries Park
 Hsinchu City: Hsinchu City Art Site of Railway Warehouse, National Hsinchu Living Arts Center
 Hualien: Hualien Cultural and Creative Industries Park
 Kaohsiung: Dadong Arts Center, Meinong Cultural and Creative Center, National Kaohsiung Center for the Arts, Pier-2 Art Center
 Keelung: Embrace Cultural and Creative Park
 Miaoli: Wu Chuo-liu Art and Cultural Hall
 New Taipei: Banqiao 435 Art Zone, Xinzhuang Culture and Arts Center
 Pingtung: Pingtung Performing Arts Center
 Taichung: Taichung City Tun District Art Center, Taichung Cultural and Creative Industries Park, Taichung Shiyakusho
 Tainan: Blueprint Culture and Creative Park, National Tainan Living Arts Center
 Taipei: Huashan 1914 Creative Park, Mind Set Art Center, National Taiwan Arts Education Center, Puppetry Art Center of Taipei, Songshan Cultural and Creative Park, Taipei City Arts Promotion Office
 Taitung: National Taitung Living Art Center, Taitung Railway Art Village
 Taoyuan: Taoyuan Arts Center, Zhongli Arts Hall
 Yilan: National Center for Traditional Arts

Thailand
 Bangkok Art and Culture Centre

See also
 Artivism
 Cultural center
 Infoshop
 Music venue
 Not-for-profit arts organization
 Social center

References

Arts centres
Types of art museums and galleries
Contemporary art galleries